Al Shoula Group was founded in 1970, and the founder was Mishaal Al Saud. Beginning with investments in insurance and real estate, it expanded into oil trading and ordinance support. Al Shoula's administrative control has been passed on to Prince Mishaal's son, Prince Abdulaziz bin Mishaal since the late 1990s.

Its growth gathered momentum as the Kingdom began investing heavily in infrastructure with Al Shoula developing an expertise in real estate development. The company has broad financial exposure in multi billion dollar projects in Saudi Arabia and throughout the Persian Gulf region. It also has invested in cement manufacture, in the primary and secondary tiers of the petroleum and petrochemical industries, in addition to international finance.

References

External links
 Official website

1970 establishments in Saudi Arabia
Conglomerate companies established in 1970
Conglomerate companies of Saudi Arabia